De Westereen is a railway station located in De Westereen, Netherlands. The station was opened on 1 October 1885 and is located on the Harlingen–Nieuweschans railway between Leeuwarden and Groningen. Train services are operated by Arriva.

The station was called Zwaagwesteinde (the former Dutch name for the village) until 12 December 2015 when it was renamed De Westereen. This was to reflect the official name of the town, which was changed in 2009.

Train services

Bus services

See also
 List of railway stations in Friesland

Railway stations in Friesland
Railway stations opened in 1885
Railway stations on the Staatslijn B